Anton Rabie is a Canadian billionaire businessman, the co-founder and co-CEO (with Ronnen Harary) of toy company Spin Master.

As of March 2018, Forbes estimated his net worth at  billion.

References

Living people
Canadian billionaires
Canadian company founders
Canadian chief executives
Year of birth missing (living people)